Asian Highway 6 (AH6) is a route in the Asian Highway Network in Asia and Europe. It runs from Busan, South Korea (on ) to the border between Russia and Belarus.

For much of its Russian stretch, AH6 coincides with the unofficial Trans-Siberian Highway and, west of the Ural Mountains, with European route E30 of the International E-road network.

South Korea
   : Busan-Centre - Busan-
  National Route 7: Busan- Nopo-dong - Ulsan (Munsu Interchange)
  Donghae Expressway: Ulsan - Pohang(S.Pohang IC)
  National Route 7 : Pohang - Samcheok
  Donghae Expressway: Samcheok - Gangneung - Sokcho
  National Route 7: Sokcho - Goseong

North Korea
  : Kosong - Wonsan
 Branch:  Pyongyang–Wonsan Motorway: Wonsan - Pyongyang
 (Marked as  National Route 7 by South Korea): Wonsan - Hamhung - Sinpo - Tanchon - Kimchaek - Chongjin - Rason

Russia
05A-214: border with North Korea – Khasan - Razdolnoye
Razdolnoye – Artyom
05A-608 (branch): Vostochny Port – Nakhodka – Artyom
05A-615 / 05K-605: Artyom – Vladivostok
: Vladivostok - Ussuriysk
05A-215: Ussuriysk - Pogranichny - border with China

China
 : Suifenhe - Harbin - Qiqihar - Manzhouli

Russia

: border with China - Zabaykalsk - Chita
: Chita - Ulan-Ude - Irkutsk
: Irkutsk - Krasnoyarsk - Kemerovo - Novosibirsk
: Novosibirsk - Omsk - Isilkul

Kazakhstan
: Karakoga - Petropavl - Chistoe

Russia
: Petukhovo - Kurgan - Chelyabinsk
: Chelyabinsk - Ufa - Samara - Penza - Ryazan - Moscow
: Moscow - Krasnoye (:  M1 highway)

Asian Highway Network
Roads in Russia
Roads in North Korea
Roads in South Korea
Roads in Kazakhstan
Roads in China
Transport in South Korea